Roy Young may refer to:

Roy A. Young (1882–1960), American banker; chairman of the Federal Reserve 
Roy V. Young, American fantasy writer
Roy Young (American football) (1917–1987), American football player
Roy Young (musician) (1934–2018), British rock and roll musician
Roy Young (educator) (1921–2013), American scholar and academic administrator